Yin Chen-hao (born 10 March 1985) is a Taiwanese director of music videos. His debut feature film is Man in Love (2021).

During his graduate studies in chemistry at National Tsing Hua University, Yin cofounded Spacebar Studio in February 2012 with five other NTHU students. Spacebar Studio's early videos were low budget projects directed by Yin that were posted online, then subsequently went viral. He directed the 2021 romantic drama Man in Love, his first feature-length film, and an adaption of the 2014 South Korean film of the same name.

References

External links
Spacebar Studio official website

1985 births
Living people
Taiwanese film directors
Music video directors
People from Changhua County
National Tsing Hua University alumni